Circuit judge may refer to:

 Circuit judge, a judge in a circuit court in various jurisdictions
 Circuit judge (England and Wales)
 Circuit judge, a judge who sits on any of the United States courts of appeals, known as circuit courts
 List of current United States circuit judges
 Circuit judge, a judge who sat on the now defunct United States circuit court

See also
 Circuit justice, of the Supreme Court of the United States
 Circuit riding